Taramchuk is a village in Marinka Raion (district) in Donetsk Oblast of eastern Ukraine, at 33.9 km SW from the centre of Donetsk city.

The War in Donbass, that started in mid-April 2014, has brought along both civilian and military casualties.

Demographics
Native language as of the Ukrainian Census of 2001:
Ukrainian 68.02%
Russian 31.47%
Belorussian 0.51%

References

External links
 Weather forecast for Taramchuk

Villages in Volnovakha Raion